also known as Chōsokabe Chikakazu was a Japanese samurai of the Sengoku period. He was the second son of Chōsokabe Motochika who was adopted by the Kagawa clan in Amagiri Castle.

After Chōsokabe clan's successor Chōsokabe Nobuchika's death in the Battle of Hetsugigawa, Toyotomi Hideyoshi advised Chōsokabe Motochika to make Chikakazu as a successor. However, Motochika selected his favored Chōsokabe Morichika for Chōsokabe clan's successor.
Chikakazu died at the age of 20 because of illness in 1587.

References

Samurai
1567 births
1587 deaths
Chōsokabe clan